is a one-shot manga by Clamp, published in Vol. 4/5 (a special double issue) of Kodansha's Young Magazine in 2002.

Plot 
Murikuri is a series of short stories featuring aliens, a man conceiving a baby, a pervert Father Santa and his girlfriend, and a pig.  Many of these stories revolve around sexual desire.  The first story involves a girl giving a love letter to a pig.  His friend, a grade-school boy, envies the pig because of the pig's height, which allows him to see girl's panties.  Another story is about aliens abducting a woman because they find her attractive.  The longest story is about a man discovering he's carrying a baby (which will grow in his back), which is an unwelcome surprise as while it means he and his wife will have a child, it also means they can no longer have sex until the stability period. Another features a schoolgirl who is dating Santa Claus, and is disappointed that she cannot spend Christmas with him (because he has to work).

Reception
On Manga Sanctuary, one of the staff members gave it a rating of 5 out of 10.

References

External links

One-shot manga
Manga anthologies
Comedy anime and manga
Seinen manga
Works by Clamp (manga artists)
Kodansha manga